M. bovis  may refer to:
 Moraxella bovis, the pink eye, a Gram-negative, aerobic, oxidase-positive diplococcus bacterium species implicated in infectious keratoconjunctivitis in cattle
 Mycobacterium bovis, a slow-growing, aerobic bacterium species causative of tuberculosis in cattle
 Mycoplasma bovis, a bacterium associated with bovine respiratory disease

See also
 Bovis (disambiguation)